In the teachings of Theosophy, the Manu is one of the most important beings at the highest levels of Initiation of the Masters of the Ancient Wisdom, along with Sanat Kumara, Gautama Buddha, Maitreya, the Maha Chohan, and Djwal Khul.  According to Theosophy, each root race has its own Manu which physically incarnates in an advanced body of an individual of the old root race and physically progenerates with a suitable female partner the first individuals of the new root race.  The Theosophical concept of the Manu is derived from the concept in Hinduism that the Manu was the being who was the progenitor of the human race. 

When the Manu is spoken of in Theosophy, normally the "being" referred to, is the Vaivasvatu Manu.

Theosophy

In Theosophy, the Vaivasvatu Manu is regarded as the progenitor of the fifth root race, the Aryan root race.  This progeneration is believed to have taken place 100,000 years ago in Atlantis.  

The progenitor of the fourth root race, the Atlantean root race, is called the Chakshusha Manu and is in appearance an individual of the Mongolian race. 

According to C.W. Leadbeater, a colony will be established in Baja California by the Theosophical Society under the guidance of the Masters of the Ancient Wisdom in the 28th century for the intensive selective eugenic breeding of the sixth root race.  The Master Morya will physically incarnate in order to be the Manu ("progenitor") of this new root race.

Ascended master teachings
In the Ascended Master Teachings, a group of religions based on Theosophy, it is taught that the Vaivasvatu Manu has a twin flame, i.e., a divine complement or celestial wife.  However, her name has not yet been revealed.

In the Ascended Master Teachings, the being C.W. Leadbeater called the "Chakshusha Manu" is referred to as Lord Himalaya.  According to Elizabeth Clare Prophet, "Lord Himalaya" was the teacher of Maitreya when Maitreya incarnated in as one of the first individuals of the new Atlantean root race that was then being progenerated by the "Lord Himalaya" from the Lemurian root race—Maitreya served in the Garden of Eden, which was actually a mystery school of the Great White Brotherhood run by the "Lord Himalaya" that was located in what is now San Diego, California, which was then part of Lemuria.

See also 
 Manu and Yemo
 Hodgson Report
 Seven Rays

References

Further reading
 Education in the New Age. Lucis Publishing Company. 1940
 The Light of the Soul. Lucis Publishing Company
 The Destiny of the Nations. Lucis Publishing Company
 The Externalisation of the Hierarchy. Lucis Publishing Company
 Campbell, Bruce F. A History of the Theosophical Movement Berkeley:1980 University of California Press
 Godwin, Joscelyn The Theosophical Enlightenment Albany, New York: 1994 State University of New York Press
 Johnson, K. Paul The Masters Revealed: Madam Blavatsky and Myth of the Great White Brotherhood Albany, New York: 1994 State University of New York Press
 Melton, J. Gordon Encyclopedia of American Religions 5th Edition New York:1996 Gale Research  ISSN 1066-1212 Chapter 18--"The Ancient Wisdom Family of Religions" Pages 151-158; see chart on page 154 listing Masters of the Ancient Wisdom; Also see Section 18, Pages 717-757 Descriptions of various Ancient Wisdom religious organizations.

External links
 Theosophical University Press: Madame Blavatsky and other theosophists

Ascended Master Teachings